Netechma magna is a species of moth of the family Tortricidae. It is found in Loja Province, Ecuador.

References

Moths described in 2001
Netechma